Erica mollis, the soft heath, is a species of Erica that was naturally restricted to the city of Cape Town, occurring nowhere else in the world.

References 

mollis
Endemic flora of South Africa
Flora of the Cape Provinces
Natural history of Cape Town
Taxa named by Henry Cranke Andrews